"Sending All My Love" is the debut single released by freestyle/pop group Linear from their 1990 eponymous debut album. It is their biggest hit, peaking at No. 5 in the U.S. The single was certified gold (500,000 units sold) on May 18, 1990. Produced by Tolga Katas and written by Tolga Katas and Charlie Pennachio

Track listing
US 12" single

US 12" single (1990)

 Germany 12" single (1990)

Charts

Weekly charts

Year-end charts

Certifications

References

1990 debut singles
Linear (group) songs
1990 songs
Atlantic Records singles
Freestyle music songs